Purple Butterfly is a 2003 Chinese film, directed by Lou Ye. It is Lou's third film after Weekend Lover and Suzhou River. It stars Chinese mainland actors, Zhang Ziyi, Liu Ye and Li Bingbing, as well as Japanese actor Tōru Nakamura. The film premiered on May 23, 2003, at the 2003 Cannes Film Festival, and was given a limited release in New York City the following year on November 26, 2004.

The film was only released in one theater in the United States (in New York City) for three weeks where it grossed $17,790.

Plot

Cynthia (Zhang Ziyi) and a Japanese student, Itami (Tôru Nakamura), have fallen in love in Japanese controlled Manchukuo prior to the war when Itami is forced to return to Japan.

Years later, in Shanghai, Szeto (Liu Ye) and Tang Yiling (Li Bingbing) have fallen in love. Cynthia has also returned to Shanghai now as a member of Purple Butterfly, a powerful resistance group against the Japanese occupation, led by Xie Ming (Feng Yuanzheng). After a case of mistaken identity and a shootout at a railroad station that leaves Yiling dead, Szeto finds himself an unexpected pawn in the battle between former lovers Cynthia and Itami who has also come to Shanghai, now as a member of the Japanese secret police unit tasked with dismantling Purple Butterfly.

Cast
 Zhang Ziyi as Cynthia
 Tōru Nakamura as Hidehiko Itami
 Liu Ye as Szeto
 Feng Yuanzheng as Xie Ming
 Li Bingbing as Tang Yiling
 Lan Yan as A Zi
 Kin Ei as Yamamoto

Reception 
With the success of Lou's previous film, Suzhou River (2000), Purple Butterfly was an anticipated follow up with a considerably larger budget. The film received polarizing receptions. Rotten Tomatoes records a 45% "rotten" rating. Metacritic records the film received a 68 score out of 100, meaning "generally favorable reviews".

G. Allen Johnson of the San Francisco Chronicle describes the film as "a gorgeously shot, ambitious epic". Kevin Thomas of the Los Angeles Times called the film, "a remarkable period piece, evoking the bustling, dense and increasingly dangerous Shanghai of the '30s". Thomas praised Zhang as an actress with "formidable resources" and "has that crucial gift of holding herself in check at just the right moments for maximum dramatic impact and psychological complexity". Thomas further state the film is "suspenseful, atmospheric and sometimes puzzling".
 
However, other critics saw the film as technically masterful but a case where style had trumped substance. In particular the film's labyrinthine and difficult to follow plot was pointed to as a major point of complaint. One such review by Sean Axmaker of the Seattle Post-Intelligencer called the film "lush but confusing", and states "Purple Butterfly is rich with emotional turmoil and searing beauty, but it could have used a little more time in the editing room to make sense of it all."

References

External links 

Purple Butterfly at MonkeyPeaches
Purple Butterfly at HelloZiyi.us
 

2003 films
Chinese war drama films
Second Sino-Japanese War films
Chinese neo-noir films
2000s Mandarin-language films
2000s Japanese-language films
Films set in Shanghai
Films directed by Lou Ye
Films set in Manchukuo
Japan in non-Japanese culture